Prateek Sharma (born 24 November 1990) is an Indian television producer, film producer and director, managing director and creative head of LSD Films.

Early life and education 
Prateek Sharma was born and brought up in Indore on 24 November. His parents are Suman Sharma and Ram Gopal Sharma. He did his schooling at St Arnold's Higher Secondary School.  He studied Mass Media and communication at EMRC, Indore.

Post his studies he moved to Mumbai to work with Star India Pvt Ltd. Prateek Sharma joined Star Plus as executive producer and his first show was Pratigya, starring Pooja Gor and Arhaan Behl. He then went on to be an executive producer on Ek Hazaaron Mein Meri Behna Hai, Starring, Karan Tacker, Krystle DSouza, Nia Sharma and Kushal Tandon.

Career 
Prateek was then offered the show, one of the longest-running on Star Plus called Saath Nibhana Saathiya which had Devoleena Bhattacharjee playing the lead role of Gopi. The show ran for over 6 years and Prateek had a crucial role to play in it. His next was conceptualized by him called Jaana Na Dil Se Door, starring Vikram Singh Chauhan. He quit Star Plus and went on to become the writer and showrunner of Sony Entertainment Television's Beyhadh, starring Jennifer Winget, Kushal Tandon and Aneri Vajani.

He founded his production house in 2017 and Launched his first show Ek Deewaana Tha on Sony Entertainment Television. The show starred Vikram Singh Chauhan, Namik Paul, Amar Upadhyay, Donal Bisht, and so on.

Moving in the horror genre, he produced episodic for &TV - Laal Ishq. He worked with several big names on this one - Prince Narula, Yuvika Choudhary, Sana Amin, Ankit Siwach, Helly Shah, Anuj Sachdeva, Krip Suri and many others.

Post Laal Ishq he produced another supernatural thriller for ZeeTV called Manmohini starring Ankit Siwach, Garima Rathore and Reyhna Pandit. The show went on for a year and currently it's taken a leap and The new star cast consists of Karam Rajpal and Vaishali Thakkar.

Post Manmohini, he went on to produce Sufiyana Pyaar Mera for Star Bharat with Helly Shah and Rajveer Shekhawat in the lead. Helly also played a double role in it.

His latest offing is on Colors and is called Bahu Begum. It stars Arjit Taneja, Samiksha Jaiswal and Diana khan. It's a love triangle.

He then worked on Beyhadh 2, the sequel to Beyhadh. It starred Jennifer Winget, Ashish Chowdhury and Shivin Narang. The show aired from 2 December 2019. It had an abrupt end due to the Coronavirus and lockdown.

Television shows 
The following is the list of television shows produced by Prateek Sharma under his banner LSD Films

References

External links

Living people
1990 births
Indian television producers
Hindi-language film directors
Film producers from Mumbai
Indian television presenters
Film directors from Mumbai
Punjabi people
Indian Hindus
21st-century Indian film directors